Pink Music Festival 2014 was the first edition of the Pink Music Festival contest organised by Serbian broadcaster RTV Pink and featuring artists from City Records. It was held in the RTV Pink studio in Šimanovci on the outskirts of Belgrade on 28 and 29 April 2014 and broadcast live on RTV Pink. All songs were mimed, which was much-criticised by the Serbian press.

Preparation 
The contest was announced on 7 March 2014, and artists had a one-month window to submit songs before the deadline of 12pm on 6 April 2014. From the 700–800 songs submitted, the final lineup of 26 songs was chosen by a four-member selection committee comprising Željko Mitrović (director and editor-in-chief of RTV Pink), Milica Mitrović (RTV Pink programming executive), Darko Popović (RTV Pink PR manager) and Bane Stojanović (head of City Records). The list of entries was announced on 10 April, and the running order for the semi-final was drawn live on Pink TV on 12 April. Performances of the entries were filmed in the RTV Pink studio and published on YouTube on 16 April.

Format 
The contest was split over 2 nights, with the semi-final being held on 28 April 2014 and the final on 29 April. The results of the semi-final were decided entirely by SMS voting, with the 10 songs that received the fewest votes being eliminated. Rather than a combined jury-televote system as in Eurovision since 2010, the final featured a separate Public Award (for the song with the most SMS votes) and Jury Award (for the song ranked highest by the jury), as well as an Artists' Award voted for by the competing singers, a Sponsors' Award chosen by the event's sponsors, and a YouTube Award for the song with the most YouTube views.

Entries

Semi-final 
The semi-final was held on 28 April. Viewers could vote by SMS from the start of the show, and the 16 qualifiers to the final were decided entirely by the public vote.

Final 
The final was held on 29 April in the RTV Pink studio in Šimanovci. Artists including Ceca, Dragana Mirkovic, Zeljko Joksimovic, Jelena Rozga and Aca Lukas performed in the interval.

The jury in the final comprised 10 journalists and entertainment executives:
 Ivan Vuković, editor-in-chief of Skandal magazine
 Tamara Drača, journalist for Star magazine
 Aleksandar Jovanović, editor of Telegraf online portal
 Ivona Palada Višnjić, journalist for Informer daily newspaper
 Sandra Rilak, journalist for Kurir daily newspaper
 Ljubica Arsenović, press, Radio S
 Danijela Petrović, press, DM SAT
 Srdjan Milovanović, owner of TV KCN Kopernikus
 Raka Marić, entertainment executive
 Bane Obradović, entertainment executive

Artists' Award voting

*After the first round of voting, there was a tie between Tropico Band, Željko Samardžic and Marina Visković, so a second round followed in which each contestant voted for one of the three.

Winners

External links 
 Pink Music Festival YouTube channel
 
2014 in music
2014 in Serbia 
Rock festivals in Serbia
Music festivals in Serbia
Music festivals established in 2014
2014 music festivals
Events in Belgrade